Allosorus pulchellus is a species name of a fern, which may refer to:

Allosorus pulchellus (Bory & Willd.) C.Presl, combination made in 1836, now Oeosporangium pulchellum
Allosorus pulchellus M.Martens & Galeotti, described in 1842, an invalid later homonym of the above, now called Argyrochosma formosa

Pteridaceae